Bellevue, also known as Wavertree Hall Farm, is a historic home and farm complex located near Batesville, Albemarle County, Virginia.  The main house was built in 1859, and is a two-story, hip-roofed brick building with a two-story pedimented portico.  It features wide bracketed eaves in the Italianate style and Greek Revival trim and woodwork.  There are two -story brick wings on either side of the main block added about 1913, and a two-story brick south wing added in the 1920s.  Also on the property are an antebellum log slave house, several tenant houses, a pump house, chicken house, and stable and barns.  There is also an unusual underground room built into the north side of one of the garden terraces.

It was added to the National Register of Historic Places in 1991.

References

Houses on the National Register of Historic Places in Virginia
Greek Revival houses in Virginia
Italianate architecture in Virginia
Colonial Revival architecture in Virginia
Houses completed in 1859
Houses in Albemarle County, Virginia
National Register of Historic Places in Albemarle County, Virginia